The men's 1500 metre freestyle event at the 2015 European Games took place on 24 June at the Aquatic Palace in Baku.

Results
The heats were started at 11:16 and 19:16.

References

Men's 1500 metre freestyle